Ao Guang (or ) is the Dragon King of the East Sea in Chinese folklore. He featured prominently in different works including Fengshen Yanyi and Journey to the West.

Fengshen Yanyi
According to the Fengshen Yanyi, after the passage of many years, Ao Guang had brought chaos to the world by creating droughts, storms, and other disasters. Due to the people's immense fear of the dragon king and his sons, they never dared seek protection against him from the Jade Emperor. As a result, Ao Guang enjoyed countless offerings by the people throughout a time interval of many years. One day, Nezha cleansed himself at a neighboring stream of the East Sea, causing Ao Guang's palace to shake at an annoying level. After Ao Guang's favorite investigator Li Gen and third son Ao Bing were both killed by Nezha, Ao Guang set out to talk to Nezha's father, Li Jing. Ao Guang demanded that Li Jing offer himself as a sacrifice to atone for Nezha's actions, but Li Jing refused. After a long discussion on the matter, Ao Guang, by now extremely angry, ascended to the heavens to state the issue to the Jade Emperor. However, Nezha, having opted to sacrifice himself in his father's place, appeared in heaven and began to beat Ao Guang very violently, even tearing scales from his skin and causing him to bleed. Ao Guang was forced to turn himself into a small snake and come with Nezha back to the Old Pond Pass to forget about the incident completely.

Later, Ao Guang, along with three other dragon kings, came to Old Pond Pass and took both Li Jing and his wife Lady Yin. Nezha, wishing to free them, offers the dragons all of his internal organs in exchange for his parents. Ao Guang personally agreed to Nezha's resolution with happiness and brought his internal organs to the Jade Emperor. After this point, Ao Guang's fate is unknown.

Journey to the West
In Journey to the West, the monkey king Sun Wukong obtained his Ruyi Jingu Bang, a magically expanding, gold-ringed iron rod weapon, from Ao Guang. This weapon was originally a tool for measuring the depth of sea water used by Yu the Great in his flood control and treatment efforts; hence its ability to vary its shape and length. After Yu left, it remained in the sea and became the "Pillar holding down the sea", an unmovable treasure of the undersea palace of Ao Guang.

One of Wukong's senior advisors had told him to seek out the dragon-king in order to get a powerful weapon befitting his skill. In the dragon palace, he tried out several kinds of heavenly weapons, many of which bent or completely broke as he wielded them. Ao Guang's wife then suggested the Ruyi Jingu Bang, stating that some time prior the iron rod had begun to emit a strange heavenly light and that she believed the Monkey King was destined to obtain it. When Wukong neared the pillar, it began to glow, signifying that the Monkey King was its true owner. It obediently listened to his commands and shrank to a manageable size so Wukong could wield it effectively. This awed the dragons and threw the sea into confusion, the Monkey King having removed the only thing controlling the ebb and flow of the ocean's tides. In addition to the magic staff, Wukong also forced Ao Guang to give him other magical gifts; including golden chain mail, a phoenix-feather cap, and cloud-walking boots.

Wukong solicits Ao Guang's aid later in the journey to overcome Red Boy, a demon that had captured Tang Sanzang. Ao Guang provides torrential rain in an attempt to stop Red Boy's fire but the fire could not be stopped by ordinary water. Ao Guang returns to the East Ocean unable to help Wukong defeat Red Boy. In a later adventures, Ao Guang again shows deference to Wukong and assists Wukong in a rain-making contest and creating an elixir.

Popular culture
In the MOBA game SMITE, he is featured under the name Ao Kuang, Dragon King of the Eastern Seas as a melee mage.

In the animated film Prince Nezha's Triumph Against Dragon King, Ao Guang is featured alongside the Dragon Kings of the northern, southern, and western oceans in his feud with Nezha. During this retelling of the story, the other three Dragon Kings are subdued whilst Ao Guang is impaled and petrified on Nezha's spear.

In the second expansion pack of the videogame Age Of Mythology, Ao Guang is one of the three minor gods the player can worship in the Mythic Age. He grants the player the Azure Dragon and Dragon Turtle units, and the God Power of the great flood.

See also
 Azure Dragon, Ao Guang's manifestation in Chinese astrology

Notes

References

Investiture of the Gods characters
Chinese gods
Journey to the West characters
Chinese dragons